Diomus is a genus of lady beetles in the family Coccinellidae. There are at least 20 described species in Diomus.

Species
These 65 species belong to the genus Diomus:

 Diomus akonis (Ohta, 1929) g
 Diomus amabilis (LeConte, 1852) i c g b (amiable lady)
 Diomus arizonicus Gordon, 1976 i c g
 Diomus austrinus Gordon, 1976 i c g
 Diomus balteatus (LeConte, 1878) i c g
 Diomus bigemmeus (Horn, 1895) i c g b
 Diomus caledoniensis (Bielawski, 1973) g
 Diomus debilis (Leconte, 1852) i c g b
 Diomus floridanus (Mulsant, 1850) i c g
 Diomus gillerforsi Fursch, 1987 g
 Diomus humilis Gordon, 1976 i c g
 Diomus liebecki (Horn, 1895) i c g b (Liebeck's lady)
 Diomus myrmidon (Mulsant, 1850) i c g
 Diomus notescens (Blackburn, 1889) i 
 Diomus ochroderus (Mulsant, 1850) g
 Diomus pseudotaedatus Gordon, 1976 i c g b
 Diomus pumilio (Weise, 1885) i c g
 Diomus roseicollis (Mulsant, 1853) i c g b
 Diomus rubidus (Motschulsky, 1837) g
 Diomus sexualis (Fauvel, 1903) g
 Diomus taedatus (Fall, 1901) i c g
 Diomus terminatus (Say, 1835) i c g b
 Diomus texanus Gordon, 1976 i c g b
 Diomus thoracicus (Fabricius, 1801) g
 Diomus xanthaspis (Mulsant, 1850) i c g b
Australian species
     Diomus ancorus Pang & Slipinski, 2009
     Diomus australasiae (Blackburn, 1892)
     Diomus australis (Blackburn, 1889)
     Diomus bimaculatus Pang & Slipinski, 2009
     Diomus brisbanensis (Blackburn, 1895)
     Diomus brookfieldi Pang & Slipinski, 2009
     Diomus bunya Pang & Slipinski, 2010
     Diomus capital Pang & Slipinski, 2009
     Diomus carbine Pang & Slipinski, 2010
     Diomus casuarinae (Blackburn, 1889)
     Diomus circus Pang & Slipinski, 2010
     Diomus corticalis (Lea, 1908)
     Diomus cowleyi (Blackburn, 1895)
     Diomus cucullifer (Blackburn, 1892)
     Diomus denhamensis Weise, 1929
     Diomus elutus (Lea, 1902)
     Diomus ementitor (Blackburn, 1895)
     Diomus ferrugineus Weise, 1895
     Diomus flavolaterus (Lea, 1926)
     Diomus frater (Lea, 1902)
     Diomus gilvus Pang & Slipinski, 2010
     Diomus gingera Pang & Slipinski, 2010
     Diomus hamatus Weise, 1895
     Diomus hebes Pang & Slipinski, 2010
     Diomus impictus (Blackburn, 1895)
     Diomus inaffectatus (Blackburn, 1892)
     Diomus insidiosus (Blackburn, 1889)
     Diomus inusitatus (Blackburn, 1889)
     Diomus jocosus (Blackburn, 1892)
     Diomus kamerungensis (Blackburn, 1895)
     Diomus kioloa Pang & Slipinski, 2010
     Diomus kosciuszko Pang & Slipinski, 2009
     Diomus kuranda Pang & Slipinski, 2009
     Diomus leai Pang & Slipinski, 2010
     Diomus lord Pang & Slipinski, 2010
     Diomus lubricus (Blackburn, 1889)
     Diomus macrops (Lea, 1929)
     Diomus maestus (Lea, 1926)
     Diomus mareebensis (Blackburn, 1895)
     Diomus marmorosus Pang & Slipinski, 2009
     Diomus micrus Pang & Slipinski, 2010
     Diomus millaamillaa Pang & Slipinski, 2009
     Diomus ningning Pang & Slipinski, 2009
     Diomus notescens (Blackburn, 1889)
     Diomus obumbratus (Blackburn, 1895)
     Diomus operosus (Blackburn, 1895)
     Diomus pisinus Pang & Slipinski, 2010
     Diomus planulatus (Blackburn, 1895)
     Diomus poonindiensis (Blackburn, 1889)
     Diomus prodigialis Pang & Slipinski, 2010
     Diomus pumilio Weise, 1885
     Diomus reidi Pang & Slipinski, 2009
     Diomus robustus (Weise, 1929)
     Diomus scapularis (Weise, 1885)
     Diomus sedani (Blackburn, 1889)
     Diomus simplex (Blackburn, 1889)
     Diomus sphragitis (Weise, 1885)
     Diomus storeyi Pang & Slipinski, 2009
     Diomus striatus (Lea, 1902)
     Diomus subclarus (Blackburn, 1895)
     Diomus subelongatulus (Blackburn, 1892)
     Diomus sublatus (Blackburn, 1892)
     Diomus sydneyensis (Blackburn, 1892)
     Diomus tasmanicus Pang & Slipinski, 2010
     Diomus tenebricosus (Boheman, 1859)
     Diomus tinaroo Pang & Slipinski, 2009
     Diomus torres Pang & Slipinski, 2009
     Diomus triangularis (Lea, 1902)
     Diomus variiceps (Lea, 1929)
     Diomus victoriensis (Blackburn, 1892)
     Diomus villus Pang & Slipinski, 2010
     Diomus weiri Pang & Slipinski, 2009
     Diomus whittonensis (Blackburn, 1892)
     Diomus yarrensis (Blackburn, 1895)
     Diomus zborowskii Pang & Slipinski, 2009

Data sources: i = ITIS, c = Catalogue of Life, g = GBIF, b = Bugguide.net

References

Further reading

External links

 

Coccinellidae
Coccinellidae genera
Taxa named by Étienne Mulsant